Westover High School may refer to:
Westover High School (Fayetteville, North Carolina)
Westover Comprehensive High School, Albany, Georgia